The Green Ridge Railroad was a  narrow gauge railroad that operated in Allegany County, Maryland.

It belonged to the Mertens family, and supplied lumber to a sawmill at Oldtown for use by the Merten's boatyards in Cumberland to construct and repair canal boats. It connected to the Baltimore and Ohio Railroad at Okonoko, West Virginia, and ended at the Chesapeake and Ohio Canal, across the Potomac River from Paw Paw, West Virginia.

The railroad opened in 1883 and operated as a common carrier through 1891. Subsequently, it operated as a private carrier until it closed in 1894.

Locomotives
The two locomotives for the GRRR were built at the Mount Savage Locomotive Works, for T. H. Paul, under contract.
 Green Ridge Number 1 is featured in an illustration of the Mt. Savage catalog, as the model for the 0-6-0s.
 GRRR Number 2 is an 0-4-0.

Disposition of the engines is unknown.

See also
 List of Maryland railroads

References

Defunct Maryland railroads
3 ft gauge railways in the United States
Narrow gauge railroads in Maryland